Roman Penn (born September 1, 1997) is an American college basketball player for the Drake Bulldogs of the Missouri Valley Conference (MVC). He previously played for the Siena Saints.

High school career
Penn attended Bishop Noll Institute in Hammond, Indiana, winning one regional and three sectional titles. As a senior, he averaged 15.5 points, 6.1 rebounds and 3.1 assists per game. Penn, who stood 5 ft 10 in (1.78 m), did not receive offers from any NCAA Division I programs due to his size, and opted to attend Don Bosco Prep in Crown Point, Indiana. After one semester, he committed to playing college basketball for Siena after being recruited by assistant coach Jordan Watson.

College career
Penn enrolled early at Siena, practicing and working on the scout team during his first semester. He entered the starting lineup as a freshman. On November 25, 2017, Penn recorded 14 points and a season-high 11 assists in an 85–76 win over Hofstra. He missed his final nine games with a stress fracture and a cyst in his heel and underwent surgery. Penn averaged 9.7 points, 4.9 rebounds and three assists per game. Following the season, he was released from his scholarship with the departure of head coach Jimmy Patsos.

Penn transferred to Drake, choosing the Bulldogs over Northern Illinois, Kent State and Wright State. He sat out for his next year due to NCAA transfer rules. On March 6, 2020, at the MVC tournament quarterfinals, Penn recorded a sophomore season-high 26 points, eight rebounds and eight assists, leading his team to an upset win over first-seeded Northern Iowa, 77–56. As a sophomore, he averaged 12 points, an MVC-leading 5.6 assists and 4.7 rebounds per game. He earned Third Team All-MVC and All-Newcomer Team honors. On December 18, 2020, Penn scored a junior season-high 25 points in a 75–57 win over South Dakota. He suffered a season-ending broken foot against Evansville on February 21. As a junior, Penn averaged 11.2 points and an MVC-best 5.5 assists per game. On December 5, 2021, he was ruled out indefinitely after reinjuring his foot. Penn returned to game action on January 2, 2022, after missing seven games. He averaged 11.1 points and 3.9 assists per game as a senior, setting the Drake record for assists. He earned Third Team All-MVC honors at the conclusion of the regular season. Penn repeated on the First Team All-MVC in 2022-23 and received votes for Player of the Year, though the honor ultimately was earned by teammate Tucker DeVries.

Career statistics

College

|-
| style="text-align:left;"| 2017–18
| style="text-align:left;"| Siena
| 23 || 19 || 32.3 || .409 || .338 || .833 || 4.9 || 3.0 || 1.3 || .2 || 9.7
|-
| style="text-align:left;"| 2018–19
| style="text-align:left;"| Drake
| style="text-align:center;" colspan="11"|  Redshirt
|-
| style="text-align:left;"| 2019–20
| style="text-align:left;"| Drake
| 34 || 34 || 30.6 || .495 || .403 || .788 || 4.7 || 5.6 || 1.3 || .0 || 12.0
|-
| style="text-align:left;"| 2020–21
| style="text-align:left;"| Drake
| 24 || 24 || 26.8 || .452 || .333 || .702 || 3.3 || 5.5 || 1.4 || .0 || 11.2
|- class="sortbottom"
| style="text-align:center;" colspan="2"| Career
| 81 || 77 || 29.9 || .461 || .360 || .782 || 4.3 || 4.8 || 1.3 || .1 || 11.1

References

External links
Drake Bulldogs bio
Siena Saints bio

1997 births
Living people
American men's basketball players
Basketball players from Illinois
Drake Bulldogs men's basketball players
People from Calumet City, Illinois
Point guards
Siena Saints men's basketball players